The World Curling Championships are the annual world championships for curling, organized by the World Curling Federation and contested by national championship teams. There are men's, women's and mixed doubles championships, as well as men's and women's versions of junior and senior championships. There is also a world championship for wheelchair curling. The men's championship started in 1959, while the women's started in 1979. The mixed doubles championship was started in 2008. Since 2005, the men's and women's championships have been held in different venues, with Canada hosting one of the two championships every year: the men's championship in odd years, and the women's championship in even years. Canada has dominated both the men's and women's championships since their inception, although Switzerland, Sweden, Denmark, Germany (West Germany), Scotland, the United States, Norway and China have all won at least one championship.

History
The World Curling Championships began in 1959 as the Scotch Cup. The Scotch Cup was created by Toronto public relations executive and former sports journalist Stanley D. Houston on behalf of the Scotch Whisky Association, a client of Houston's agency Public Relations Services Limited, which was looking to generate increased North American exposure for its products. The first three Cups were contested between men's teams from Scotland and Canada. The United States joined the Scotch Cup in 1961, and Sweden also joined the next year. Canada won the first six world titles, of which the legendary rink skipped by Ernie Richardson earned four. The United States was the first country to break Canada's streak, winning their first world title in 1965. By 1967, Norway, Switzerland, France, and Germany were added to the Scotch Cup, and Scotland won their first title, while Canada finished without a medal for the first time. The tournament was renamed the Air Canada Silver Broom the year after that, and Canada strung together five consecutive world titles starting in that year.

In 1973, the competing field was expanded to ten teams, and Italy and Denmark were introduced to the world stage. Sweden, Switzerland, and Norway won their first titles in the following years, and Canada continued to win medals of all colours. In 1979, the first edition of the women's World Curling Championships was held. The championships were held separately from the men's championships for the first ten years. During this time, Switzerland, Canada, Sweden, Denmark, and Germany won world titles.

Bronze medals were not awarded until 1985 for the women's tournament and 1986 for the men's tournament. Between 1989 and 1994, the bronze medal was shared by the semifinals losers.

Beginning in 1989, the men's and women's championships were held together. Norway won their first world women's title. In 1995, Ford Canada and the World Curling Federation reached an agreement to make Ford the sponsor of the World Curling Championships. Japan, the first nation from Asia to compete in the worlds, made their debut in 1990 at the women's championship, and later in 2000 at the men's championship. South Korea and China followed suit in the 2000s. Scotland won their first women's title in 2002, and the United States won their first women's title the next year.

In 2005, the men's and women's championships were separated, and an agreement was made between the World Curling Federation and the Canadian Curling Association that Canada would host one of the tournaments annually each year, all of which are title sponsored by Ford of Canada. Canada began a streak of top two finishes in the men's tournament, and China won their first world title in the women's tournament in 2009.

In 2008, a world championship for mixed doubles curling was created. Switzerland won the first world mixed doubles title, and proceeded to win four of the first five titles. Russia and Hungary won their first world curling titles in the mixed doubles championship, and New Zealand, France, Austria, and the Czech Republic won their first world curling medals.

In 2015, a world championship for mixed curling was created, replacing the European Mixed Curling Championship and supplanting the European Mixed and Canadian Mixed curling championships as the highest level of mixed curling in the world.

In 2019, the World Qualification Event was introduced, to qualify the final two teams in the men's and women's championships. A mixed doubles qualification event will also be added in the 2019–20 curling season, qualifying the final four teams of the twenty-team mixed doubles championship.

In 2020, the men's, women's and mixed doubles championships were cancelled due to the COVID-19 pandemic.

Tournament names
The World Curling Championships have been known by a number of different names over the years.

Men
1959–1967: Scotch Cup
1968–1985: Air Canada Silver Broom
1986–1988: IOC President's Cup (Hexagon)
1989–1990: WCF Championships
1991–1992: Canada Safeway World Curling Championship
1993–1994: WCF Championships
1995–2004: Ford World Curling Championship
2005–2017: Ford World Men's Curling Championship (odd years)
2006–2018: World Men's Curling Championship (even years)
2019: Pioneer Hi-Bred World Men's Curling Championship
2020: LGT World Men's Curling Championship
2021: BKT Tires & OK Tire World Men's Curling Championship

Women
1979–1981: Royal Bank of Scotland World Curling Championships
1982: World Curling Championships
1983: Pioneer Life World Curling Championships
1984: World Curling Championships
1985: H&M World Curling Championships
1986–1990: World Curling Championships
1991–1992: Canada Safeway World Curling Championships
1993–1994: World Curling Championships
1995–2004: Ford World Curling Championships
2005–2017: World Women's Curling Championship (odd years)
2006–2018: Ford World Women's Curling Championship (even years)
2019: LGT World Women's Curling Championship

Competition format
The first two world championships, held as competitions between Scotland and Canada, were held as five-game series between the two nations. Upon the addition of the United States in 1961, the format was changed to a double round robin preliminary round with a three-team knockout round at the conclusion of the round robin. The knockout round was removed for the next two championships. With the addition of more teams, a single round robin preliminary round with a four-team knockout round was implemented in 1971. The championships occurring from 1968 to 1970 included three-team knockout rounds instead of four-team knockout rounds. The knockout round format was adjusted from single-elimination to the Page playoff system in 2005.

In the championships held from 1971 to 1985, third place was awarded to either the team that lost in the semifinal of a three-team knockout round or the higher-seeded team among the losing teams of a four-team knockout round. A bronze medal game was added to the knockout round in 1986, but bronze medal games were not held from 1989 to 1994, during which bronze medals were awarded to the teams that lost in the semifinals.

Until 2017 format of the world championships used a twelve team round-robin preliminary round, after which the top four teams advance to a knockout round held using the Page playoff system.

Starting in 2018 there are 13 teams playing round-robin preliminary round with top six advancing to a single-elimination knockout with top two receiving bye to the semifinals. This includes two teams from the Americas zone, eight from the European zone (via the European Curling Championships) and three from the Asia-Pacific zone (via the Pacific-Asia Curling Championships). For 2019, the number of teams from the Asia-Pacific zone will be reduced by one, and there will also be one less team from the zone of the bottom-placed team at the 2018 championships. The two slots will be allocated to teams from the new World Qualification Event. The qualification event will have eight teams: the host country, one team from the Americas, two from Pacific-Asia, and four from Europe.

Championships

Men

Women

Mixed

Mixed doubles

Wheelchair mixed team

Wheelchair mixed doubles

National championships

Men
 Tim Hortons Brier
 United States Men's Curling Championship
 Scottish Men's Curling Championship
 French Men's Curling Championship
 Russian Curling Championships
 Italian Curling Championship
 Finnish Men's Curling Championship
 Danish Men's Curling Championship
 Swiss Men's Curling Championship
 New Zealand Men's Curling Championship
 Swedish Men's Curling Championship
 Japan Curling Championships
 Latvian Men's Curling Championship
 Norwegian Men's Curling Championship
 Estonian Men's Curling Championship
 Czech Men's Curling Championship
 Korean Curling Championships

Women
 Scotties Tournament of Hearts
 United States Women's Curling Championship
 Scottish Women's Curling Championship
 French Women's Curling Championship
 Russian Curling Championships
 Italian Curling Championship
 Finnish Women's Curling Championship
 Danish Women's Curling Championship
 Swiss Women's Curling Championship
 Swedish Women's Curling Championship
 Japan Curling Championships
 Latvian Women's Curling Championship
 Estonian Women's Curling Championship
 Czech Women's Curling Championship
 Korean Curling Championships

See also
 Curse of LaBonte
 World Junior Curling Championships
 World Senior Curling Championships
 World Mixed Curling Championship
 Curling World Cup

References

External links
 

 
World Curling Federation
Curling

Recurring sporting events established in 1959